Yousif Mohamed Ahmed Mirza Al-Hammadi (born 8 October 1988) is an Emirati former racing cyclist, who competed as a professional for UCI WorldTeam  from 2017 to 2022.

Mirza has won multiple Emirati national titles as well as winning the silver medal in the road race at the 2015 Asian Cycling Championships, qualifying him for the 2016 Summer Olympics in Brazil. He was the first Emirati cyclist to compete in the Olympic road race. After his team  disbanded at the end of the 2016 season, he joined the  team for 2017, becoming the first Emirati to ride for a UCI WorldTeam.

His older brother, Badr, also competed as a professional road cyclist.

Major results

Road

2008
 2nd Overall UAE International Emirates Post Tour
 3rd  Time trial, Arab Gulf Cycling Championships
 National Road Championships
3rd Road race
3rd Time trial
 3rd President's Cup Ras al Khaima
2009
 1st  Team time trial, Arab Gulf Cycling Championships
 2nd Road race, National Road Championships
 3rd  Road race, Arab Road Championships
 3rd Overall Tour of the AGCC Arab Gulf
1st Stage 5
 3rd Sharjah Chrono
2010
 1st  Road race, National Road Championships
 1st United Arab Emirates Season Opener
 2nd Sharjah Chrono
 Arab Gulf Cycling Championships
3rd  Road race
5th Time trial
 3rd Overall Tour of the AGCC Arab Gulf
1st Stages 1, 3 & 5
 3rd Bakhan Chrono
 3rd Vice President Cup
 4th President's Cup Ras al Khaima
 10th Road race, Asian Road Championships
2011
 Arab Road Championships
1st  Road race
1st  Time trial
 National Road Championships
1st  Time trial
4th Road race
 1st  Overall UAE International Emirates Post Tour
1st Stage 1
 1st Sharjah Chrono
 Tour of the AGCC Arab Gulf
1st Stages 7 & 8
 2nd  Time trial, Arab Club Cycling Championships
 2nd President's Cup Ras al Khaima
 3rd  Road race, GCC Games
 5th Road race, Pan Arab Games
2012
 1st  Time trial, Arab Gulf Cycling Championships
 National Road Championships
1st  Time trial
2nd Road race
 1st  Overall Tour of Sharjah
1st Stages 1 & 2
 1st  Overall Tour of the AGCC Arab Gulf
1st Stage 2
 1st Al Khan (Sharjah)
 1st Stage 3 Tour de Ijen
2013
 National Road Championships
1st  Road race
2nd Time trial
 1st  Overall Tour of Al Zubarah
1st  Points classification
1st Stages 1 & 2
 Challenge du Prince
3rd Trophée de l'Anniversaire
6th Trophée Princier
 4th Overall Sharjah International Cycling Tour
1st Stage 2
2014
 National Road Championships
1st  Road race
1st  Time trial
 1st  Overall Sharjah International Cycling Tour
1st  Points classification
1st Stage 1
 Tour of Al Zubarah
1st  Points classification
1st Stages 2 & 3
 4th Road race, Asian Games
 10th Overall Tour d'Algérie
1st  Mountains classification
2015
 National Road Championships
1st  Road race
3rd Time trial
 2nd  Road race, Asian Road Championships
 4th Overall Tour d'Egypte
2016
 National Road Championships
1st  Road race
1st  Time trial
 4th Overall Tour de Tunisie
1st Stage 1
2017
 National Road Championships
1st  Road race
1st  Time trial
 2nd  Road race, Asian Road Championships
2018
 1st  Road race, Asian Road Championships
 National Road Championships
1st  Road race
1st  Time trial
2019
 National Road Championships
1st  Road race
1st  Time trial
 2nd Overall Tour d'Egypte
1st Stage 5
2021
 National Road Championships
1st  Road race
1st  Time trial
2022
 National Road Championships
1st  Road race
1st  Time trial
 Asian Road Cycling Championships
 4th Time trial
 7th Road race

Track

2011
 3rd  Points race, Arab Track Championships
2013
 Arab Track Championships
1st  Scratch race
1st  Team pursuit
2nd  Omnium
2nd  Points race
2015
 2nd  Points race, Asian Track Championships
2017
 3rd  Points race, Asian Track Championships
 3rd  Omnium, Asian Indoor and Martial Arts Games
2018
 Asian Track Championships
1st  Points race
2nd  Omnium
2019
 2nd  Omnium, Asian Track Championships
2022
 1st  Points race, Islamic Solidarity Games
 1st  Points race, Asian Track Championships

References

External links

1988 births
Living people
Emirati male cyclists
Place of birth missing (living people)
Cyclists at the 2010 Asian Games
Cyclists at the 2014 Asian Games
Cyclists at the 2016 Summer Olympics
Olympic cyclists of the United Arab Emirates
Cyclists at the 2018 Asian Games
Asian Games competitors for the United Arab Emirates
People from Khor Fakkan
Islamic Solidarity Games medalists in cycling